Empress Dowager Gou (苟太后, personal name unknown) was an empress dowager of the Chinese/Di state Former Qin. Her husband was Fu Xiong (苻雄), the Prince of Donghai and brother of the founding emperor Fu Jiàn. She became empress dowager in 357 after her son Fu Jiān (note different tone) seized power in a coup from his tyrannical cousin Fu Sheng (Fu Jiàn's son) and claimed the title "Heavenly Prince" (Tian Wang). In addition to Fu Jiān, she had at least one other son with Fu Xiong, Fu Shuang (苻雙) the Duke of Zhao.

Empress Dowager Gou had been widowed in 354 when Fu Xiong died. It is commonly believed that after her husband's death, she carried on an affair with her cousin Li Wei (李威), whom Fu Jiān treated effectively like a second father.

Around the new year 358, Empress Dowager Gou saw that Fu Jiān's older brother Fu Fa (苻法) the Duke of Donghai (not her son) had many visitors, and she became concerned that if he became increasingly powerful, he would pose a threat to Fu Jiān, and therefore she, after consulting with Li, ordered Fu Fa to commit suicide. This incident showed that she had substantial power during Fu Jiān's early reign. However, after this incident, her power appeared to begin to gradually dissipate, and few references were made of her from this point on. In late 367, Fu Shuang, in conjunction with Fu Sheng's brothers Fu Liu (苻柳) the Duke of Jin, Fu Sou (苻廋) the Duke of Wei, and Fu Wu (苻武) the Duke of Yan, rebelled and sought Former Yan aid, threatening to tear Former Qin apart, but after Former Qin's regent Murong Ping refused them aid, the rebels collapsed in 368—and after the incident, Fu Liu's family was killed, while Fu Wu and Fu Shuang's sons were spared but not allowed to inherit their titles—while Fu Sou, who was ordered to commit suicide, had all of his sons spared and created dukes, and this led to one of the few references to her, as she questioned Fu Jiān why he did not permit Fu Shuang's title to be retained while permitted Fu Sou's sons to have duke titles. Fu Jiān's response was that the empire was built by Fu Jiàn, and that his sons must all have heirs, and that Fu Shuang, in rebelling, abandoned both his empire and his mother and therefore did not deserve an heir.

No other act of Empress Dowager Gou was mentioned in history. The final reference to her was in 371, when Fu Jiān was out hunting and stayed at the hunt for more than 10 days, and an actor named Wang Luo (王洛) tried to persuade him to end his hunt by telling him that he should be mindful of the empress dowager's welfare, implying that she was still alive then. It is not known when she died.

Former Qin people
Sixteen Kingdoms empresses dowager